Brithdir is an area in the community of Berriew, Powys, Wales, which is 78 miles (126 km) from Cardiff and 151 miles (243 km) from London. It lies to the north-east of Berriew and is noted for its motte and bailey castle.

Notable residents 
 David Jones of Brithdir (built Brithdir Hall, 1610)

References

See also 
 List of localities in Wales by population

Villages in Powys